"Repetition" is a single by New Zealand band DD Smash. It was released in 1981 as their debut single and later appeared on their album Cool Bananas. It reached #25 on the New Zealand charts.

References

1981 singles
DD Smash songs
1981 songs
Mushroom Records singles
Songs written by Dave Dobbyn